Amuropaludina is a genus of freshwater snails which have a gill and an operculum, aquatic gastropod mollusks in the family Viviparidae.

Species 
Species within the genus Amuropaludina include:
 Amuropaludina chloantha (Bourguignat, 1860)
 Amuropaludina pachya (Bourguignat, 1860)
 Amuropaludina praerosa (Gerstfeldt, 1859) - type species

References

Viviparidae